Mayette may refer to:
 Muriel Mayette (born 1964), a French actress
 a walnut cultivar